Hendersonville is the largest city in Sumner County, Tennessee, on Old Hickory Lake. The population was 61,753 at the 2020 census.

Hendersonville is the fourth-largest city in the Nashville metropolitan area after Nashville, Murfreesboro, and Franklin and the 10th largest in Tennessee. Hendersonville is located 18 miles northeast of downtown Nashville. The city was settled around 1784 by Daniel Smith, whose house Rock Castle, completed in 1796, is maintained as an historic site. 

The city is named for William Henderson, the first postmaster here.

Numerous 20th-century musicians in the Nashville area lived in Hendersonville, especially some associated with country music. These include  Johnny Cash and his wife June Carter Cash, and Roy Orbison. The city's main road, Johnny Cash Parkway, is named for the late singer. 

Other notable past and present residents include Conway Twitty. (His home, Twitty City, was adapted as the Trinity Music City complex after his death in 1993.) In addition, Jean Shepard, Marty Stuart, Kelly Clarkson, Max T. Barnes, Taylor Swift, Young Buck, and Chris Henderson (3 Doors Down) have lived here.

History
In 1784 Daniel Smith received a land grant from the state of North Carolina in payment for surveying Middle Tennessee. (North Carolina at the time claimed its boundaries extended to this territory across the Appalachian Mountains.) He began work on his house later known as Rock Castle, but it was not completed until 1796. Due to his surveying trips, he frequently was gone on long journeys, and his wife supervised much of the construction.

In 1790, William Henderson settled in Sumner County and later became the namesake of the town. It was a trading center for the county, which was devoted to the production of tobacco and hemp as commodity crops, and blood livestock: both horses and cattle. During the Civil War, Monthaven was used by Union troops as a field hospital, as they occupied Middle Tennessee from 1862 to 1870. In the late 20th century, this historic home was listed on the National Register of Historic Places. Even before the Emancipation Proclamation of January 1863, refugee slaves with their families found their way to Union lines in the state in search of freedom. The Army established a contraband camp near Hendersonville, to offer shelter to the freedmen, help them with supplies and food, and sign them up to work for wages for the Army, often building defenses. Missionary societies helped teach both adults and children among the slaves. 

The small city was not incorporated until 1969, as the area continued to be rural and devoted to agriculture and related activities. It then had roughly 250 residents and was led by L.H. "Dink" Newman. Since the late 20th and early 21st centuries, it has grown to become the largest city in the county.

With the completion of the Old Hickory Dam  and an associated lake in 1954, Hendersonville started to develop more rapidly. The lake attracted sportsmen and people seeking recreation; some became residents or acquired second homes here. Since the late 20th century, it has become the most-populous city of Sumner County, and one of the most populous suburbs of Nashville, along with Franklin and Murfreesboro. The city contains around 0.7% of the population of Tennessee.

Geography

Hendersonville is served by the freeway Tennessee State Route 386 and its parallel surface road U.S. Route 31E.

Climate
Hendersonville's climate classifications are Köppen "Cfa" and Trewartha "DOak" due to very hot summers (three to four months average over ), mild winters (all months average over ), and mediocre (4–7 months) growing seasons (in this case seven months average over ).

Demographics

2020 census

As of the 2020 United States census, there were 61,753 people, 21,328 households, and 14,788 families residing in the city.

2010 census
As of the 2010 United States Census, there were 51,372 people, 20,111 households, and 14,239 families residing in the city. The population density was 1,881.76 persons per square mile, and the housing unit density was 736.67 units per square mile. The racial makeup of the city was 88.64% White, 6.28% Black or African American, 1.58% Asian, 0.33% Native American, 0.07% Pacific Islander, 1.21% from other races, and 1.89% from two or more races. Those of Hispanic or Latino origins were 3.62% of the population.

Of the 20,111 households, 33.47% had children under the age of 18 living in them, 55.71% were married couples living together, 3.92% had a male householder with no wife present, 11.17% had a female householder with no husband present, and 29.20% were non-families. 24.35% of all households were made up of individuals, and 8.77% had someone living alone who was 65 years of age or older. The average household size was 2.55 and the average family size was 3.04.

Of the 51,372 residents, 25.80% were under the age of 18, 61.41% were between the ages of 18 and 64, and 12.79% were 65 years of age or older. The median age was 38.5 years. 51.71% of the residents were female and 48.29% were male.

The median household income in the city was $62,627 and the median family income was $74,353. Males had a median income of $54,016 versus $34,996 for females. The per capita income for the city was $30,000. About 6.5% of families and 8.9% of the population were below the poverty line, including 13.0% of those under the age of 18 and 7.6% of those age 65 and over.

2000 census
As of the census of 2000, there were 40,620 people, 15,823 households, and 11,566 families residing in the city. The population density was 1,486.4 people per square mile (573.9/km2). There were 16,507 housing units at an average density of 604.0 per square mile (233.2/km2). The racial makeup of the city was 92.93% White, 4.12% African American, 0.27% Native American, 1.10% Asian, 0.03% Pacific Islander, 0.65% from other races, and 0.90% from two or more races. Hispanic or Latino of any race were 1.71% of the population.

There were 15,823 households, out of which 35.7% had children under the age of 18 living with them, 59.3% were married couples living together, 10.7% had a female householder with no husband present, and 26.9% were non-families. 22.3% of all households were made up of individuals, and 6.5% had someone living alone who was 65 years of age or older. The average household size was 2.55 and the average family size was 3.00.

In the city, the population was spread out, with 25.8% under the age of 18, 7.8% from 18 to 24, 31.5% from 25 to 44, 24.8% from 45 to 64, and 10.2% who were 65 years of age or older. The median age was 36 years. For every 100 females, there were 94.9 males. For every 100 females age 18 and over, there were 90.3 males.

The median income for a household in the city was $50,108, and the median income for a family was $57,625. Males had a median income of $40,823 versus $27,771 for females. The per capita income for the city was $24,165. About 5.2% of families and 6.2% of the population were below the poverty line, including 8.2% of those under age 18 and 7.7% of those age 65 or over.

Economy
It is the home of the Indian Lake Village business, shopping, residence, and recreation complex.

Arts and culture
The Hendersonville Arts Council is a non-profit organization located in Monthaven Mansion.  The mansion was built before the Civil War and was used as a hospital during several battles.  It is listed on the National Register of Historic Places, the Tennessee Civil War Trail, and Ring of Fire, and exhibits visual art, music, workshops, wine tastings, crafts, culinary demonstrations, performances, and cultural activities.

The Hendersonville Performing Arts Center is a non-profit theater founded in 1996.

Government
Hendersonville is governed by a board of 12 aldermen and a mayor, known as the Board of Mayor and Aldermen (BOMA). The aldermen are elected by district for staggered terms of four years. The mayor is elected once every four years by the whole city.

Education

Public schools
Hendersonville's schools are governed by the Sumner County Schools. Schools located in Hendersonville include:
 
 Anderson Elementary
 Beech Elementary
 Beech High School
 Dr. William Burrus Elementary at Drakes Creek
 Ellis Middle School
 Gene Brown Elementary School
 George Whitten Elementary
 Hawkins Middle School
 Hendersonville High School
 T. W. Hunter Middle School
 Indian Lake Elementary
 Knox Doss at Drakes Creek Middle School
 Lakeside Park Elementary
 Merrol Hyde Magnet School
 Nannie Berry Elementary School
 Walton Ferry Elementary School

Private schools
 Hendersonville Christian Academy (pre-K–12)
 Pope John Paul II High School

Infrastructure
In 2007 a risk was identified that the trouble-prone Wolf Creek Dam in the neighboring state of Kentucky might break, which could have resulted in a complete inundation for the lower lying parts of Hendersonville. Since then, extensive repairs have been performed on the dam, and the maximum level of water behind it has been lowered, thus reducing the pressure of water on the structure and resolving the identified flood risk.

Notable people

 Gary Allan, country singer
 Duane Allen, country singer, member of The Oak Ridge Boys
 David Archuleta, pop singer
 Max T. Barnes, singer, songwriter, producer
 James O. Bass, Tennessee state legislator and lawyer
 Josh Berry, NASCAR driver for JR Motorsports
 Joe Bonsall, country singer, member of The Oak Ridge Boys
 Young Buck, (real name: David Brown), hip hop artist
Jesse Brand, songwriter, actor
 Jo-Ann Campbell, 1950s rock artist married to Troy Seals
 Johnny Cash, country singer (deceased)
 June Carter Cash, country singer (deceased)
Kelly Clarkson and Brandon Blackstock
Easton Corbin, country singer
Zac Curtis, MLB pitcher
 Jimmy Fortune, country singer
 William Lee Golden, country singer, member of The Oak Ridge Boys
 Chris Henderson, rock musician, grammy award nominee/winner member of 3 Doors Down
 Harold Hunter, basketball coach, first African American to sign a contract with the National Basketball Association
 Jalen Hurd, former running back for the Tennessee Volunteers football team, former wide receiver for the Baylor Bears football team. Drafted in the 2019 NFL draft 3rd round 67th pick by the San Francisco 49ers
 Jeff Jarrett, professional wrestler
 Karen Jarrett, formerly Karen Angle, former wife of Kurt Angle and current wife of Jeff Jarrett
 John Jenkins, NBA player
 Bob Luman, country singer (deceased)
 Barbara Mandrell, country singer and entertainer
 Ronnie McDowell, country singer
 Bill Monroe, bluegrass originator
 Lennon Murphy, singer-songwriter
 Josef Newgarden, IndyCar Series racing driver and 2017 series champion
 Roy Orbison, rock singer (deceased)
 Sonny Osborne, bluegrass banjo player
 Luther Perkins, country guitarist (deceased)
 Rachael Price, jazz vocalist
 Thomas Rhett, Country singer
 Tommy Rich, wrestler (former NWA World Champion)
 John Rogan, second tallest verified human being with 8 ft 8 in (2.64m) (deceased)
 Johnny Russell, country singer, songwriter (deceased)
 Dan Seals, country musician, member of England Dan and John Ford Coley (deceased)
 Troy Seals, country music songwriter
 Ed Sheeran,  singer, songwriter
 Jean Shepard, country singer (deceased)
 Ricky Skaggs, country singer
 Connie Smith, country singer
 Phil Stacey, country singer, American Idol season 6 finalist
 Richard Sterban, country singer, member of The Oak Ridge Boys
 Marty Stuart, country singer
 Taylor Swift, country and pop singer-songwriter, 11-time Grammy Award winner
 Golden Tate, Detroit Lions wide receiver
 Merle Travis, singer/guitarist (deceased)
 Conway Twitty, country singer (deceased)
 Larry Underwood, writer, actor, horror host (as Dr. Gangrene)
 Greg Upchurch, drummer, grammy award winner, 3 Doors Down
 Paul Yandell, guitarist, (deceased), longtime stage sidekick of Chet Atkins

Religion

Hendersonville Presbyterian Church

References

External links

 Hendersonville official city website
 Hendersonville Chamber of Commerce

Cities in Tennessee
Cities in Sumner County, Tennessee
Cities in Nashville metropolitan area
Populated places established in 1784